Squash competitions at the 2021 Junior Pan American Games in Cali, Colombia were held from 26 November to 1 December 2021.

Medal summary

Medal table

Medalists

References

External links
Squash at the 2021 Junior Pan American Games

Squash
Junior Pan American Games
Qualification tournaments for the 2023 Pan American Games